Qala-e-Bost, also romanized Qalai Bust, is a fortress in Bost, Helmand Province, Afghanistan, built 3000 years ago. It is located at 31° 30’ 02″ N, 64° 21’ 24″ E near the convergence of the Helmand and Arghandab Rivers, a half-hour's drive south of Lashkargah. Qala-e-Bost is famous for its 11th century decorative arch, which appears on the 100 Afghani note (Afghan currency). The arch is part of the remains of a mosque.

History 
In 2006, construction began on a cobblestone road to lead from the south of Lashkargah to the Qala-e-Bost Arch (known to readers of James A. Michener's Caravans as Qala Bist.) As of April 2008, it was possible to descend into an ancient shaft about 20 feet across and 200 feet deep, with a series of dark side rooms and a spiral staircase leading to the bottom. In 2020, restoration work started on the fort.

In 2021, it became home to hundreds of people who fled Taliban clashes.

See also 

 List of castles in Afghanistan

References

External links 
 Qala-e-Bost images

Helmand Province
Ruins in Afghanistan
Forts in Afghanistan
Buildings and structures in Helmand Province